Football at the 1950 Maccabiah Games was the football tournament held as part of the 1950 Maccabiah Games. It was held in several stadiums in Israel and began on 28 September.

The competition was open for men's teams only. Teams from 5 countries participated, after a team from the Netherlands withdrew. The tournament was won by Israel.

Format
The five teams played each other once in various venues in Israel, for a total of 4 matches for each team.

Results

References

1950
Maccabiah Games